Archimedes is a liquid-fuel rocket engine burning liquid oxygen and liquid methane in an oxidizer-rich staged combustion cycle. It is designed by aerospace company Rocket Lab for its Neutron rocket.

History 
Archimedes was presented on December 2, 2021 in a webcast by Rocket Lab CEO Peter Beck. It was presented as a fully reusable, gas generator engine using LOX and methane as propellant, a departure from the company's previous Rutherford, which is electrically pump fed. It is expected to have its first hot-fire test during 2022.
In an interview published on CNBC website, Mr. Beck stated that Archimedes would be manufactured in New Zealand and its very simple design had "all the things you want when you have to build an engine that can be reused over and over again.”
In the September 21st, 2022 Investor Day Presentation, the engine design had changed to an oxidizer-rich staged combustion cycle. It was also implied, but not confirmed, that the engine would be built in the Virginia, USA factory. It was also disclosed they would use the Stennis Space Center A-3 Test stand for development testing. They expected to start preburner testing in that or following quarter, hopefully starting full engine testing at Stennis before 2023 ends, and hoped to be able to launch in 2024.

Design 

Archimedes is presented as a highly reusable liquid-propellant engine using methane and liquid oxygen in a oxidizer-rich staged combustion cycle. There are both sea-level and vacuum variants. The engine is mostly 3D printed, with some of the biggest 3D printers in the world. The rationale for the cycle change from the original gas generator was that they could not get the performance they needed through all the throttle points that a reusable rocket needs, without pushing the turbine temperature and other factors beyond their preset limits. By changing to the higher performing cycle but with lower performance requirements, they were able to lower temperatures and other stress factors and increase margins everywhere, making reusability much more attainable.

See also

Rocket Lab Neutron
Rutherford (rocket engine)
Curie (rocket engine)
Merlin (rocket engine family)

References

External links
 Rocket Lab Neutron Rocket

Archimedes
Rocket engines using methane propellant
Rocket engines using the gas-generator cycle
Space programme of New Zealand
Space program of the United States